Vandervis is a surname. Notable people with the surname include:

 Lee Vandervis (born 1955), New Zealand politician
 Ria Vandervis (born 1984), New Zealand actress